Holy Sepulchre London, formerly and in some official uses Saint Sepulchre-without-Newgate, is the largest Anglican parish church in the City of London. It stands on the north side of Holborn Viaduct across a crossroads from the Old Bailey, and its parish takes in Smithfield Market. During medieval times, the site lay outside ("without") the city wall, west of the Newgate.

It has London's musicians' chapel in which a book of remembrance sits and an October/November requiem takes place – unusual for a church associated with Low Church Evangelicalism. The church has two local army regiment memorials.

The vicar is appointed by St John's College, Oxford, which has held the church's patronage since 1622.

The church is within the Newgate Street Conservation Area.

History
The original (probably pre-Norman) church on the site was dedicated to St Edmund the King and Martyr. In 1137 it was given to the Priory of St Bartholomew. During the Crusades of that century the church was re-dedicated to Saint Edmund and the Holy Sepulchre, venerating the Church of the Holy Sepulchre in Jerusalem. Knights passed by on the way to the Holy Lands. This name became contracted, and in the 21st century reference to the saint-king has been overwhelmingly dropped. The very early lessening of the first dedication helped to reserve that name for the small church to the east of St Paul's Cathedral dedicated 
to St Edmund, King and Martyr.

The church is today the largest parish church in the city. It was completely rebuilt in the 15th century but was gutted by the Great Fire of London in 1666, which left the outer walls, the tower and the porch standing. It was rebuilt 1667-1679 by Joshua Marshall, the King's Master Mason, and appears to be remodelled to Marshall's own design. Lightly modified in the 18th century, the interior of the church is a wide, roomy space with a coffered ceiling installed in 1834 with plasterwork of three years later. The church underwent considerable re-facing and alterations in 1878. During the Second World War the 18th-century watch-house, built in the churchyard to deter grave-robbers, was bomb-struck but later  rebuilt. The vicarage was fully renovated in the early 2000s.

During Mary I's persecutions, in 1555, the incumbent vicar John Rogers was burned at the stake as a heretic.

Bells
The bells are referred to in the nursery rhyme Oranges and Lemons as the "bells of Old Bailey".

In 1605, London merchant tailor  John Dowe paid the parish £50 to buy a handbell and to mark the execution of prisoners at the nearby gallows at Newgate. This execution bell is displayed in a glass case in the nave. Between the 17th and 19th centuries, the clerk was responsible for ringing it outside the condemned man's cell in Newgate Prison the night before his execution, and announcing the following "wholesome advice":

Given proximity to Newgate Prison and the Old Bailey, built on the site of the prison, certain of the bells in its tower, aside from marking time, celebrating weddings and communion, were rung to announce executions. In the first years of the court this was as the condemned felon was led to Tyburn.

Musicians' Chapel
By the north aisle is the Musicians' Chapel. As St Stephen's chapel it hosted votive masses to the 12th-century monastic saint Stephen Harding prior to the English Reformation and during the reign of Mary I of England.

It was rededicated to musicians by Dr. W.R. Matthews, Dean of St Paul's, on 2 January 1955 in the presence of many distinguished musicians including an orchestra conducted by Sir Malcolm Sargent and the BBC Singers.  Its four windows commemorate Sir Henry Wood, John Ireland,
Dame Nellie Melba and
Walter Carroll

The chapel's appearance and the Musicians' Book of Remembrance are maintained by the Friends of the Musicians' Chapel. A Service of Thanksgiving for all those in the book is held at the church each year as well as a requiem close to All Souls' Day. Many concerts and memorial events for musicians have been held in the church. In 2017 the vicar ceased parish funds financing the requiem and allowing of most free rehearsing time. A protest was held and many prominent musicians including John Rutter sought continued benevolence from the wider congregation and church patron. Attempts to mediate failed.

Army memorials
The south aisle of the church holds the regimental chapel of the Royal Fusiliers (City of London Regiment) (merged to form the Royal Regiment of Fusiliers), to whom its gardens are a memorial. The west end of the north aisle has memorials for the City of London Rifles (the 6th Battalion London Regiment).

Protection and recognition of architecture
The church has been designated a Grade I listed building (the highest grade) since 1950.

Notable people associated with the church
Thomas Culpeper, Tudor courtier, buried here
Thomas Gouge, minister ejected in 1662
Samuel Gurney, MP, erected the first drinking fountain for the Metropolitan Drinking Fountain and Cattle Trough Association on the railings of the church. It was restored to the original location in 1913 and remains there.
Rev Dr Peter Mullen, commentator, author and former rector, sometime chaplain to the London Stock Exchange
John Rogers, minister, Bible translator, and the first English Protestant martyr under Mary I of England
Sir Anthony St Leger, Tudor judge, and his first wife Eleanor Markham, buried here
Sir John Smith, governor of Virginia and associate of Pocahontas, buried 1631 in the south aisle. Smith is also commemorated by a window designed by Francis Skeat and installed in 1968.
Austin Osman Spare, artist, attended the church school, now a physiotherapy centre, behind the church in Snow Hill Court
Roger Williams (1603–1683), founder of Rhode Island
Sir Henry Wood, conductor
Charles Wriothesley, long-serving officer of arms at the College of Arms, buried 1562 in the middle aisle

Organ

The north aisle is dominated by a splendid organ built by Renatus Harris in 1670; the organ case is its sole mention in the architectural listing, adding a date, 1677.

The organ was enlarged in 1817 by James Hancock and by John Gray in 1828 and 1835, and Gray and Davison in 1849, 1852 and 1855. It was rebuilt in 1932 by Harrison and Harrison. A specification of the organ can be found on the National Pipe Organ Register. It is not currently playable, though efforts are being made to restore it to a playable condition. A Makin digital organ is used when required for services.

The choir has now composed of eight professional singers.

Organists

Francis Forcer 1676–1704
Thomas Deane 1705–1712
Benjamin Short 1712–1760
William Selby and Samuel Jarvis 1760–1773
Samuel Jarvis 1773–1784
George Cooper 1784–1799
George Cooper 1799–1843 (son of above)
George Cooper 1843–1876 (son of above)
James Loaring
Edwin Matthew Lott
Edgar Pettman
Frank B. Fowle 
Peter Asprey (Director of Music; present)
Joshua Ryan (Organist elect; from May 2022)

See also

List of churches and cathedrals of London

References

External links

St Sepulchre-without-Newgate church website

11th-century establishments in England
Church of England church buildings in the City of London
Diocese of London
Grade I listed churches in the City of London
Holy Trinity Brompton plants